WJYD (107.1 MHz) is a commercial FM radio station licensed to Circleville, Ohio, and serving the Columbus metropolitan area.  Branded as "Joy 107.1," the station is owned by Urban One and broadcasts an urban gospel radio format.

WJYD's effective radiated power (ERP) is 6,000 watts.  The transmitter site is on Ringgold-Fairfield Road in Circleville.

Station history

Early years (1965-198?) 
In 1965, the station signed on the air as WNRE, which stood for the young owner's name, Nelson Embry. At the time, the station broadcast from a small downtown Circleville studio with a very low power signal. The transmitter was later moved to its present location on a hill along State Route 159 northeast of Circleville.

Hard rock (198?-198?) 
In the mid-1980s, the station adopted the Z-Rock syndicated hard rock format.

Adult contemporary (198?-1989) 
The station changed its call letters to WLRO with the slogan "Lady Radio", featuring programming geared specifically towards women.

Classic hits (1989-1990) 
That was short lived, and in 1989, the station was changed to "Classic Hits 107.1", with a classic hits format.

Christian (1990-1993) 
In the early 1990s, it was WTLT "The Light", playing a Contemporary Christian format.

Top 40 (1993-1995) 
In 1993, 107.1 flipped to a simulcast of 105.7's Rhythmic CHR format, first as "Hot 105/107", then as CHR/Pop "105.7/107.1 Kiss FM". In April 1994, the CHR/Pop "KISS-FM" branding and format moved exclusively to 107.1, becoming "The New 107.1 Kiss FM".

'70s hits (1995-1996) 
In January 1995, after teasing a "major announcement" for about a week, 107.1 flipped to '70s music as "Arrow 107.1", complimenting 105.7 once again.

Active rock (1996-2013) 
Arrow ended in 1996 and 107.1 then became Active Rock "107.1 The Big Wazoo." The station complimented its sister station WLVQ, which had a classic rock format.

Country (2013-2015) 
This name and format would broadcast on 107.1 until January 8, 2007 at 8 PM, when WAZU flipped to country as "Wink 107.1". “Wink” debuted with Big & Rich’s “Comin' to Your City” followed by Brooks & Dunn’s “Play Something Country”.

On April 1, 2013, the country format of Wink was merged with K95's format and became "K95 at 107.1" with a classic country format, changed shortly after to "K107.1".

Gospel (2015-present) 
At 12:00 a.m., on November 13, 2015, the station flipped to a simulcast of WXMG, as Radio One had purchased WHOK-FM and sister WZOH-FM from Wilks. WHOK then flipped to urban gospel as "Joy 107.1" on November 16 at 5:00 p.m. The station changed its call sign to the current WJYD on November 23, 2015.

References

External links
01/07 :: New "WINK" WAZU Complaints & Poll

JYD
Gospel radio stations in the United States
Urban One stations
JYD